Tree of the Year may refer to:
 European Tree of the Year
 Tree of the Year (United Kingdom)